The 2016 World Fencing Championships were held at the Carioca Arena 3 in Rio de Janeiro, Brazil from 25 to 27 April 2016. Only two disciplines that are not in the 2016 Olympic program were held.

Medal summary

Medal table

Events

References

 
2016
World Fencing Championships
World Fencing Championships
2016 World Fencing Championships
International fencing competitions hosted by Brazil
World Fencing Championships
2010s in Rio de Janeiro